Blanca Iris Alejo Tejeda (born 16 March 1962) is a Dominican Republic table tennis player. She competed at the 1988 Summer Olympics and the 1996 Summer Olympics.

References

External links
 

1962 births
Living people
Dominican Republic female table tennis players
Olympic table tennis players of the Dominican Republic
Table tennis players at the 1988 Summer Olympics
Table tennis players at the 1996 Summer Olympics
Pan American Games medalists in table tennis
Pan American Games bronze medalists for the Dominican Republic
Medalists at the 1983 Pan American Games
Table tennis players at the 1983 Pan American Games